This is a list of festivals in Chicago, Illinois, United States.

Architecture
 Open House Chicago, October

Arts and crafts 
 57th Street Art Fair, Hyde Park, June
 Chicago Art Book Fair, November
 Chicago Artists Month, September/October
 Gold Coast Art Fair, Grant Park, June
 Manifest, Columbia College Chicago, May
 SOFA Chicago, Navy Pier, October/November
 Wells Street Art Festival, Old Town, June

Community festivals and celebrations 
 Andersonville City Made Fest, Andersonville, September
 Fulton Fest, Near West Side, September
 Northalsted Market Days, Boystown, August
 Ribfest Chicago, North Center, June
 Six Corners BBQ Fest, Six Corners, Portage Park, June

Culture, heritage and folk 
 African Festival of the Arts
 American Spanish Dance and Music Festival
 Celtic Fest Chicago
 Chicago Humanities Festival
 Fiesta Del Sol Pilsen
 Lebanese Food Festival
 Midwest Buddhist Temple Ginza Holiday Festival
 Printers Row Lit Fest, June
 Venetian Night, August  
 Von Steuben Day (Ferris Bueller's Day Off)

Fiction and fantasy 
 Capricon
 Chicago Comic & Entertainment Expo
 Wizard World Chicago

Film 
 Chicago Feminist Film Festival
 Chicago International Children's Film Festival
 Chicago International Documentary Film Festival
 Chicago International Film Festival
 Chicago International REEL Shorts Festival
 Chicago Latino Film Festival
 Chicago Outdoor Film Festival
 Chicago Palestine Film Festival
 Chicago Underground Film Festival
 Juggernaut: A Sci-Fi and Fantasy Film Festival
 Midwest Independent Film Festival
 Polish Film Festival in America

Flowers
 Botanic Gardens Antiques & Garden Fair
 Chicago Flower and Garden Show

Food 
 Chicago Food Truck Festival
 Good Food Festival & Conference
 Ribfest Chicago
 Six Corners BBQ Fest
 Taste of Chicago
 Taste of Polonia
 Taste of Randolph, June

Holiday 
 Christkindlmarket
 Clark Street Spooktacular
 Magnificent Mile Lights Festival
 Spooky Zoo Spectacular
 The Way of the Cross Downtown Chicago

LGBT
 Chicago Pride Parade

Music, theatre and performing arts

Music
 Alehorn of Power
 Chicago Blues Festival
 Chicago Country Fest
 Chicago Flamenco Festival
 Chicago Gospel Music Festival 
 Chicago Jazz Festival 
 Chicago Maritime Festival
 Estrojam's Decibelle Music and Culture Festival
 Grant Park Music Festival
 Hyde Park Jazz Festival
 Lake Shake
 Latino Music Festival
 Lollapalooza
 Mamby on the Beach
 Midwest Clinic
 Midwest Wonderland Music Festival
 North Coast Music Festival
 Pitchfork Music Festival
 Ribfest Chicago
 Riot Fest
 Spring Awakening Music Festival
 Square Roots
 World Music Festival Chicago

Performing arts
 Chicago Fringe Festival
 Chicago Improv Festival
 Chicago Sketch Fest
 Paragon: A Sci-Fi and Fantasy Short Theatre Play Festival
 Windy City Burlesque Festival

Parades 
 Bud Billiken Parade and Picnic
 Chicago Columbus Day Parade
 Chicago Pride Parade
 Chicago St. Patrick's Day Parade
 Chinese New Year Parade
 McDonald's Thanksgiving Parade
 Mexican Independence Day Parade
 Northwest Side Irish Parade
 Polish Constitution Day Parade
 Puerto Rican Day Parade

Sports
 Bike The Drive
 Boulevard Lakefront Tour
 Chicago Marathon
 Chicago Yacht Club Race to Mackinac
 Crosstown Classic

Transportation 
 Chicago Air & Water Show
 Chicago Auto Show

Other 

 Around the Coyote
 Chicago Science Festival
 MDW Fair
 Pier Walk
 Version Fest
 Viva Chicago

Discontinued festivals 
 Art Chicago
 Asian Animation Film Festival
 Chicago Reggae Festival
 ChicagoFest
 Cineme
 Green Apple Music & Arts Festival
 Intonation Music Festival
 Looptopia

References

External links

 Chicago festivals
 Chitown Festivals
 Seasonal Chicago festivals

Festivals
Chicago